Hyderabad bombings may refer to:

 May 2007 Mecca Masjid bombing
 August 2007 Hyderabad bombings
 February 2013 Hyderabad bombings